Vichkino is a rural locality (a village) in Butylitskoye Rural Settlement, Melenkovsky District, Vladimir Oblast, Russia. The population was 162 as of 2010.

Geography 
Vichkino is located 19 km north of Melenki (the district's administrative centre) by road. Muralyovo is the nearest rural locality.

References 

Rural localities in Melenkovsky District